Joaquim José da França Júnior (March 18, 1838 – November 27, 1890) was a Brazilian playwright, journalist and, initially, a painter. Alongside Martins Pena, he is one of the most famous adepts of the "comedy of manners" genre.

He is patron of the 12th chair of the Brazilian Academy of Letters.

Life
França Júnior was born in Rio de Janeiro, in 1838, to Joaquim José da França and Mariana Inácia Vitovi Garção da França. He studied in the Colégio Pedro II and at the Faculdade de Direito da Universidade de São Paulo. Graduating in 1862, he moves to Bahia, where he exerces his profession for some time.

Returning to Rio de Janeiro in 1880, he entered at the Escola Nacional de Belas Artes, where he studied under guidance of Georg Grimm. A member of the Grimm Group, he would later abandon the painting to dedicate himself only to literature.

His plays are famous for mocking and ridicularizing the situation of Brazil during the final years of the 19th century.

He died in 1890.

Works
 Meia Hora de Cinismo (1861)
 A República-Modelo (1861)
 Tipos da Atualidade (1862)
 Ingleses na Costa (1864)
 Defeito de Família (1870)
 Amor com Amor se Paga (1870)
 Beijo de Judas (1881)
 Como se Fazia um Deputado (1881)
 Caiu o Ministério! (1882)
 Maldita Parentela (1887)
 Entrei para o Clube Jácome (1887)
 De Petrópolis a Paris (1889)
 As Doutoras (1889)
 Portugueses às Direitas (1890)

External links
 França Júnior's biography at the official site of the Brazilian Academy of Letters 

1838 births
1890 deaths
Brazilian male dramatists and playwrights
University of São Paulo alumni
Writers from Rio de Janeiro (city)
Patrons of the Brazilian Academy of Letters
19th-century Brazilian dramatists and playwrights
19th-century Brazilian male writers